Anderson's Cove is a former community on the south coast of the province of Newfoundland and Labrador.

See also 
 List of ghost towns in Newfoundland and Labrador

References 

Ghost towns in Newfoundland and Labrador